Zyornovo is a rural locality (a selo) in Suzemsky District, Bryansk Oblast, Russia. The population was 436 as of 2013. There are 8 streets.

Geography 
Zyornovo is located 21 km south of Suzemka (the district's administrative centre) by road. Seredina-Buda is the nearest rural locality.

References 

Rural localities in Suzemsky District